Sohra Khal-e Sefid (also Romanized as Şoḩrā Khāl-e Sefīd) is a village in Murcheh Khvort Rural District, in the Central District of Shahin Shahr and Meymeh County, Isfahan Province, Iran. At the 2006 census, its population was 17, in 5 families.

References 

Populated places in Shahin Shahr and Meymeh County